The Rogart Brooch is a large penannular brooch of Pictish origin, dated to the eighth century. Characteristic of contemporary Pictish brooches, it contains three-dimensional  bird-head inserts formed with glass.

It was discovered at Rogart, Sutherland, in Scotland in 1868 as part of a hoard of 8th century brooches. The hoard was unearthed during rock-blasting for the construction of the Sutherland Railway. A workman found the collection of brooches in earth uncovered by the removal of a large boulder. He immediately left his work and disappeared southwards, on the way passing two brooches to Mr Macleod, a shopkeeper in Cadboll, who displayed them to the Society of Antiquaries of Scotland in 1870. The total number of brooches discovered in the hoard was not recorded at the time.

Both brooches are in the archaeology collection of the National Museum of Scotland. The Rogart Brooch, the larger of the two, is on permanent display in the museum in Edinburgh. A third brooch from the find went to the collection of the then Duke of Sutherland and later to Dunrobin Castle.

Descriptions

Rogart Brooch

The brooch is made from a flat band of silver decorated with carved and alternating interlace patterns some of which are in gold, and a head that is a quarter inch thick. The hoop is divided into four quadrants, each of which is decorated with interlace. The bird-heads are rendered in full-relief, all inward-facing, fixed with rivets, lined with gold, with narrow eyes made from green glass. They are placed on both the upper band of the ring and the quadrants of each of the two cloverleaf-shaped terminals.

The brooch is in relatively good condition; some of the settings for decorative studs in the head and terminals, made from red glass and amber, are missing. Its reverse is rather flat and unembellished.

Smaller brooch
The smaller brooch is made from silver and is in poor condition, having lost all its glass studs.

References

Sources
 
 

 
 "Proceedings of the Society of Antiquaries of Scotland". Society of Antiquaries of Scotland, 1882

Individual brooches
Celtic brooches
Pictish art
Silver-gilt objects